James W. Gray (August 7, 1862 – January 31, 1938) was a Major League Baseball infielder. He played just six games in the major leagues, but they were spread across ten years. He did not return to the majors until , when he played two games for the Pittsburgh Burghers as a second baseman, then returned to the Alleghenys to play one game as a shortstop.

References

Major League Baseball infielders
Pittsburgh Alleghenys players
Pittsburgh Burghers players
Pittsburgh Pirates players
Syracuse Stars (minor league baseball) players
Buffalo Bisons (minor league) players
Wheeling National Citys players
Wheeling Nailers (baseball) players
Texarkana (minor league baseball) players
Baseball players from Pennsylvania
1862 births
1938 deaths
19th-century baseball players
Burials at Homewood Cemetery